China Zheshang Bank, abbreviated as CZB, is a national joint-stock commercial bank based in the People's Republic of China and regulated by the People's Bank of China.

Overview 
China Zheshang Bank has its headquarters in Hangzhou, China and serves customers through a network of 109 branches across the major cities in the country. In 2014, the bank ranked 208 in the "Global Banking 1000" list by the UK based Banker magazine.

History 

China Zheshang Bank trances its roots from Zhejiang Commercial Bank that was formed in 1993 in Ningbo, Zhejiang Province of China. The Zhejiang Commercial Bank was a Sino-foreign bank jointly owned by Bank of China, Hong Kong Nanyang Commercial Bank, Bank of Communications, and the Zhejiang International Trust and Investment Co.

On June 30, 2004, the China Banking Regulatory Commission approved the restructuring, renaming and relocation of Zhejiang Commercial Bank and on August 18, 2004, China Zheshang Bank was officially opened as a new bank in Hangzhou.

Once launched, the bank structured its overall business strategy in two five-year phases:
 Phases 1 - 2004 to 2008 - The main focus was the Zhejiang province market.
 Phases 2 - 2009 to 2013 - To focus on the developed regions of China.
, China Zheshang Bank a registered capital base of CN¥ 11.5 billion, total assets of CN¥ 6,700 billion, CN¥ 360 billion in customer deposits and CN¥ 260 billion in issued loans.

In September 2015, CZB announced plans to raise around US$1 billion through an IPO and listing on the Hong Kong Stock Exchange. The listing details were yet to be announced as at the end of October 2015.

Ownership 
China Zheshang Bank is a privately held company. , shareholding in the bank's stock was as depicted in the table below:

Governance 
China Zheshang Bank is governed by an 18-person board of directors. Of these, four are executive directors, eight are shareholders directors and six are independent directors. These directors select the chairman of the board. The current director is Shen Renkang.

See also 
 Banking in China
 List of banks in China

References 

Banks established in 2004
Banks of China
Companies based in Hangzhou
Companies listed on the Hong Kong Stock Exchange
Chinese brands
Chinese companies established in 2004